Reza Fieze Norouzi (born ) is an Iranian actor.

Filmography
Kaktus 1 (Cactus: Part I )
Kaktus 2 (Cactus: Part II )
Kaktus 3 (Cactus: Part III )
Roya-ye natamam
Bayram
Rooz-e Raftan
Ali & Dani
Jooje-Ordak-e Man
Gohar-e Kamal
Tarzan va Tarzaan
Kolah ghermezi and Sarvenaz
Kolah Ghermezi and Pesar Khaleh
Kamarbandha ra bebandim
Moomiyai III
Mard-e Hezar-Chehreh (The Thousand-Face Man), as Mr Jandaghi
Mard-e Do-Hezar-Chehreh (The Two-Thousand Face Man), as Mr Jandaghi
Ghahve-ye Talkh

External links 

1951 births
Living people
Iranian comedians
People from Kermanshah
Iranian male film actors
University of Tehran alumni
University of Arizona alumni
Iranian male television actors